Techreturns Nederland BV is a Dutch company founded with the aim to reduce electronic waste (e-waste). It does this by buying used electronics, especially mobile phones, from consumers and companies to repair them and give them a second life. Some choose to donate mobile phone through organisations such as Masterpeace and Artis Zoo.   The company's revenues comes from selling the second hand devices mainly in Asia and Africa where there is a market for affordable, quality electronics. Sales also take place in Europe, especially in the Netherlands through its sister company BeatsNew.

Techreturns is connected to Closing the Loop a foundation collecting e-waste in developing countries for recycling. Involved in this project are also the organisations Fairphone and Text to Change.

Recently, Techreturns has appeared multiple times in the Dutch media, for instance in a discussion about sustainability initiatives by the Dutch government, an annual summary of Dutch sustainable businesses 2013 by MVO Netherlands and in the consumer television programme Kassa on 14-01-14 in a segment about reuse versus recycling in the electronic industry.

Techreturns was founded in 2009, is based in Amsterdam, Netherlands and is a part of Social Enterprise Nederland.  Additionally Techreturns has a department in Genova, Italy.

References

Electronic waste